Bandbon castle is a historical castle located in Rudsar County in Gilan Province, The longevity of this fortress dates back to the Hundreds of years ago.

References 

Castles in Iran
Rudsar County